The Adventurous Captain (Spanish: El capitán aventurero) is a 1939 Mexican film directed by Arcady Boytler. It stars Carlos Orellana. It is 1 hour and 30 minutes long.

References

External links
 

1939 films
1930s Spanish-language films
Mexican black-and-white films
Mexican musical films
1939 musical films
1930s Mexican films